Zacapu (Place of Stones), is a city and surrounding municipality in the Nahuatzen mountains of Michoacán, Mexico. Geographic features in Zacapu include the Cerro del Tecolote mountain range and Zacapu Lagoon.

Demographics
The 2010 Mexican census indicated that the city had a population of 52,806 and the municipality a population of 73,455.

Notable people
 José Ángel Aguilar, writer
 Rudy Gutierrez, noted oncologist
 Juan B. Guido, poet
 Fray Jacobo Daciano, Danish Franciscan priest, member of the Tzintzuntzan convent
 Primo Tapia de la Cruz, labor leader who organized farming communities against landholders. He was assassinated in 1926.
 Abel Alcázar Pallares, philanthropist and community activist
 Armando Martínez (cyclist), cyclist
 Rodolfo Vitela, cyclist
 Jorge del Pozzo, businessman
 César Martínez, boxer
 Adolfo García Trujillo, marathonist
 Eugenio Calderón, professional footballer, played for Cruz Azul, Morelia, Irapuato, Tigres and Guadalajara. Retired in 1992.
Jaime Contreras, artist, designer, welder, semi-professional footballer.
Hugo Ayala Castro, professional footballer, play for Morelia, Atlas and currently Tigres.

References

External links
 Michoacán, Enciclopedia de los Municipios de México
 Zacapu.com, website from Zacapu city (in Spanish)
 Zacapu.gob.mx, Zacapu municipal government website (in Spanish)

Municipalities of Michoacán